Leonard Pozner is the father of a Sandy Hook Elementary School shooting victim, Noah Pozner. He is the founder of the HONR Network, which supports the victims of mass casualty violence as well as the targets of online hate speech and harassment.

Sandy Hook Elementary School shooting
On December 14, 2012, 20 year old Adam Lanza took a Bushmaster XM-15 semi-automatic rifle into Sandy Hook Elementary school and killed 20 children and 6 teachers. One of the children killed was Pozner's six-year-old son Noah. Shortly afterwards, conspiracy theorists used Facebook, YouTube, blogs and other social media platforms to claim the massacre was a hoax and a false flag operation and that the victims were actually crisis actors. Among them was radio-show host Alex Jones, who repeatedly used the conspiracy theory to tell the audience listening to his InfoWars radio program to rise up and "find out the truth", insisting that the shooting was staged by the federal government to destroy the Second Amendment and citizens' right to bear arms.

While mourning the loss of their children, Pozner and the other victims' families had to endure accusations that their children were not dead, and that the tragedy was a fraud designed to undermine Americans' gun rights. They received death threats and in-person, online and phone call harassment from people who took up the call from Jones and others. In response, Pozner began reporting harassing and defaming content and claims about him and his family, as well as posts and videos using photos (often defaced) of his son. "I have to absolutely defend the memory of my son — I have no choice" he said. "I know how some of these theories build up. They don't fade away and the more time they spend online, the more accepted they become. The JFK conspiracy theory in the US is very accepted. Conspiracy theories erase history, they erase our memories, and how will this event (Sandy Hook) be remembered a hundred years from now? So I think it's important, the work that I'm doing now."

After Pozner succeeded in getting Infowars videos removed from YouTube, Jones showed his audience Pozner's personal information and maps to addresses associated with his family. In an effort to protect themselves from the continuing harassment, Pozner and Noah's mother Veronique De La Rosa Haller, and their two surviving children, moved from Connecticut. The harassment has continued however, as each time they move, conspiracy theorists who stalk the family publish their new address. The family has had to move several times since leaving Connecticut. They currently live in hiding in a high-security community hundreds of miles from where their six-year-old son Noah is buried.

HONR Network
The HONR network is a 501(c)(3) nonprofit organization founded by Pozner in response to the harassment and hate that he and other families of victims of mass casualty events endured online. After his son died in the Sandy Hook shooting, and he and his family became the target of online abuse, volunteers reached out offering to help flag and report the hateful content. As additional mass casualty events occurred and the survivors and families of other victims reached out for assistance, Pozner decided to turn the loosely knit group into an organized non-profit.

The initial goal of the organization was to combat online hate and harassment, particularly when directed at survivors and the families of victims of violent tragedies and mass casualty events. More recently the organization mission has expanded to provide guidance for all people affected by harassment, bullying and abuse. The HONR Network now has around 300 volunteers who help monitor and remove harassing content online.

Lucy Richards
In 2017, Floridian Lucy Richards was sentenced to 5 months in prison for threatening Pozner's life. She admitted in her guilty plea to being part of the active online community of Americans who believe that the Sandy Hook shooting was staged and that the victims and their mourning family members are only actors. US district judge James Cohn called Richards' actions towards Pozner "disturbing" and condemned those who spread false claims about the deaths of the victims. "This is reality and there is no fiction. There are no alternative facts" Cohn told Richards at her sentencing.

Campaigns
Pozner and the HONR Network have had much success in changing policy and removing harmful content from the internet. In July 2018, Pozner and De La Rosa wrote an open letter to Mark Zuckerberg which was published by The Guardian website. In the letter they appealed for help from the Facebook CEO, urging him to honor the pledge he made in the US Senate: to make Facebook a safer and more hospitable place for social interaction. Pozner and De La Rosa suggested two ways to better protect victims from harassment: "Treat victims of mass shootings and other tragedies as a protected group, such that attacks on them are specifically against Facebook policy. And provide affected people with access to Facebook staff who will remove hateful and harassing posts against victims immediately." Facebook has since taken steps to recognize these victims and Pozner now works with its content moderators and policymakers. In a statement, a Facebook spokesperson told CBS News: "Following Sandy Hook, Lenny was one of the people who sent us questions and concerns. In the wake of unthinkably tragic experience, his feedback helped effect change in our policies on bullying and harassment."

Pozner has also had success with other online platforms by flagging harmful content for violations such as invasions of privacy, threats and harassment, and copyright infringement. In 2018, HONR Network reported 2,568 videos to YouTube and had 1,555 removed. Blog hosting platform WordPress.com initially refused to help. Its parent company Automattic repeatedly responded to Pozner's requests with form letters saying "because we believe this to be fair use of the material, we will not be removing it at this time".  In addition, they warned that the company could collect damages from people who "knowingly materially misrepresent" copyrights. Automattic have since made direct contact with Pozner and apologised for the form letters. It said the responses Pozner received were "a predefined statement" that is used in copyright situations. Automattic then added a new policy that prohibits blogs from the "malicious publication of unauthorized, identifying images of minors". This policy meant that images of child victims would be removed.

In May 2019, online activist group Avaaz organised meetings with executives from Twitter and Facebook to further the campaign against online hate and misinformation. Speaking at the meetings were journalist Jessikka Aro and teenage vaccination advocate Ethan Lindenberger. Pozner participated in the meetings remotely and spoke of the need to curb online harassment. "I am a strong proponent of the First Amendment, and free speech is an essential aspect of American society. However, there is a fundamental misunderstanding of people's rights and responsibilities online. A person cannot violate my civil rights to be free of harassment, bullying, or to have my likeness manipulated and my family targeted with death threats and intimidation and then simply attempt to hide behind 'free speech.'"

Alex Jones defamation case
In April 2018, in state district courts in Travis County, Texas, lawyers representing Pozner and his ex-wife Veronique de la Rasa launched a defamation suit against Alex Jones. In August 2018, Judge Scott Jenkins rejected Jones' argument and his motion to dismiss the lawsuit. In the month following the launch of the defamation suits, separate actions were launched in Connecticut, by another six families of Sandy Hook victims, and one FBI agent who was a first responder at the scene. In February 2019, in response to this suit, Judge Barbara Bellis ruled that Jones will have to submit to a sworn deposition, in addition to turning over internal financial, business, and marketing documents related to InfoWars' operations. In 2019, Jones and Infowars lost an appeal against the district court's denial of their motion to dismiss.

The same law firm filed similar defamation cases against Alex Jones and Infowars on behalf of two other parents who lost children at Sandy Hook — Neil Heslin and Scarlett Lewis.

In a separate case by the same lawyers, Marcel Fontaine launched defamation proceedings against Jones for falsely identifying him as the gunman in the Stoneman Douglas High School shooting. In response, Jones attempted to have the Pozner and Fontaine cases dismissed under the Texas Citizens Participation Act. This act is designed to protect citizens' right to free speech against plaintiffs who aim to silence them through costly litigation. Jones also sought more than $100,000 in court costs from the Pozner family.

As of February 2021, Jones and Infowars lost appeals about all four cases in the Texas Third District Court of Appeal; were denied review by the Texas Supreme Court; and are pending motions for reconsideration of those denials.

The plaintiffs' law firm, Farrar & Ball, set up a website with the filings in each of these cases, and published two videos of their deposition of Alex Jones.

Wired magazine has described the Pozner versus Jones case as highly significant with regards to free speech in the digital age. "Whether Jones wins or loses, his suit, according to First Amendment lawyers, will be a building block for the way we think of free speech in the age of the internet."

Nobody died at Sandy Hook book

In June 2019, Wisconsin judge Frank Remington ruled that Pozner had been defamed by the authors of "Nobody Died At Sandy Hook: It was a FEMA Drill to Promote Gun Control." The 455-page book, published by Moon Rock Books, argued that the Sandy Hook massacre had never happened. In it, they claim several times that Pozner had faked his son Noah's death certificate. Pozner's submissions in the case included DNA samples that match those taken by a Connecticut medical examiner that prove Noah was his son. Additionally, he submitted Noah's birth certificate, report cards and medical records into the public record. The judge ruled that there was no question of fact in the dispute, and ruled in favor of Pozner in the libel case: that the co-editors of the book, James Fetzer and Mike Palecek, had defamed Pozner. "This is a victory for myself and my family" Pozner said in an interview. "It is also a victory for the survivors and victims' families of all mass casualty events who have been targeted by these people." In an email, Fetzer restated his belief that Noah's death certificate was faked: "The American people are entitled to know the truth about their own history. Pozner later said "If Mr Fetzer wants to believe that Sandy Hook never happened and that we are all crisis actors, even that my son never existed, he has the right to be wrong. But he doesn't have the right to broadcast those beliefs if they defame me or harass me. He doesn't have the right to use my baby's image or our name as a marketing ploy to raise donations or sell his products. He doesn't have the right to convince others to hunt my family."

As the result of a separate judgment against the book's publisher, the principal officer of Moon Rock Books, Dave Gahary, agreed to stop selling the book. After listening to a 15-hour deposition, Gahary said that he no longer had any doubt that Pozner had truly lost his son. "I came away from that believing that he was telling the truth, and I felt personally bad for anything that I had done to contribute to his misery." Gahary, who has published many books on conspiracies, said he had been inundated with hate mail from deniers of the Sandy Hook massacre since his change of heart had become public. He hoped that he was sending these people a message: "If someone like me is saying that I believe him, it should carry some weight, and they should look at this event differently." A jury trial to decide damages was set for October 2019. At the trial's conclusion in July 2020, the Dane County, Wisconsin Circuit Court ordered Fetzer to pay Pozner a total of $1.1 million — $450,000 in jury-awarded damages, $650,000 in attorney's fees, and $7,395.13 in fees and costs. (Palecek and Moon Rock Books previously settled out of court.) Fetzer said he would appeal.

References

External links
 HONR Network
 This American Life, episode 670 ("Beware the Jabberwock"), about Lenny Pozner

1967 births
Living people
Activists from Connecticut
20th-century American Jews
Anti-cyberbullying activists
Crime victim advocates
Founders of charities
21st-century American Jews
Sandy Hook Elementary School shooting